Charlie Wanhope (14 August 1934 – 4 April 2016) was an  Australian rules footballer who played with Fitzroy in the Victorian Football League (VFL).

Notes

External links 
		

2016 deaths
1934 births
Australian rules footballers from Victoria (Australia)
Fitzroy Football Club players
Diamond Creek Football Club players